Qikou is a village of Nanpaihe Town, Huanghua, in the southeast of Hebei Province in North China. Lying on the coast of the Bohai Gulf, it is close to the Hebei–Tianjin border.

Transport 
 China National Highway 307
 Hebei Provincial Highway 364
 Jinqi Highway

Populated places in Hebei
Villages in China
Huanghua